This is a list of notable people associated with the University of Tartu at Tartu, Estonia.

Notable lecturers and professors

Nobel laureate

Wilhelm Ostwald, Nobel Prize in Chemistry (1909)

Humanities and social sciences
Jüri Allik, psychologist
Walter Anderson, folklorist
Paul Ariste, linguist
Jan Baudouin de Courtenay, linguist
Karl Bücher, economist and anthropologist
Vladimir Dal, lexicographer
Gustav von Ewers, legal historian
Lazar Gulkowitsch, Jewish Studies scholar, supported by Albert Einstein
Theodosius Harnack, Lutheran theologian
Siim Kallas, economist and politician (EU Commissioner; former Prime Minister)
Andres Kasekamp, historian
Emil Kraepelin, psychiatrist
Jaan Kross, writer 
Kalevi Kull, biosemiotician
Madis Kõiv, philosopher and physicist
Helga Kurm, Dean of the Pedagogical Division
Marju Lepajõe, classical philologist and religious historian
Étienne Laspeyres, economist and statistician
Wilhelm Lexis, economist, insurance scholar
Eero Loone, philosopher
Mihhail Lotman, semiotician
Juri Lotman, semiotician, historian of literature
Uku Masing, theologian and poet
Zara Mints, literary scholar
Johann Karl Simon Morgenstern, philologist
Alexander von Oettingen, Lutheran theologian, famous as statistics theoretician
Ludwig Preller, philologist and antiquarian
Villem Raam, art historian
Konstantin Ramul, psychologist
Leonid Stolovich, philosopher (aesthetic)
Rein Taagepera, political scientist
Gustav Teichmüller, philosopher
Peeter Torop, semiotician
Grigol Tsereteli, classicist and papyrologist
Jüri Uluots, lawyer and politician
Jaan Valsiner, psychologist
Alexander Vasiliev, Byzantinist and Arabist
Adolph Wagner, economist and social policy scholar

Natural science
Marlon Dumas, computer scientist
Wilhelm Anderson, astrophysicist
Ernst von Bergmann, surgeon
Friedrich Bidder, physiologist and anatomist
Alexander Andrejewitsch von Bunge, botanist
Karl Friedrich Burdach, biologist
Jaan Einasto, astrophysicist
Johann Friedrich von Eschscholtz, biologist and explorer
Moses Wolf Goldberg, chemist
Germain Henri Hess, chemist
Jaan Kalviste, chemist, mineralogist, educator and translator
Toomas Kivisild, geneticist
Emil Kraepelin, psychiatrist
Kalevi Kull, biologist
Olevi Kull, ecologist
Eerik Kumari, ornithologist
Karl Wilhelm von Kupffer, anatomist, embryologist
Carl Friedrich von Ledebour (professor of natural sciences, 1811–1836), botanist
Anders Lindstedt (1854-1939) mathematician, astronomer and pioneer of actuarial science.
Teodor Lippmaa, botanist
Viktor Masing, ecologist
Andres Metspalu, biotechnologist
Carl Anton von Meyer, botanist
Ferdinand Morawitz, entomologist
Arthur von Oettingen, physicist
Georg von Oettingen, physician
Ernst Öpik, astronomer
Georg Friedrich Parrot, physicist
August Rauber, anatomist
Matthias Jakob Schleiden, botanist
Carl Schmidt, chemist  
Oswald Schmiedeberg, pharmacologist
Peter Hermann Stillmark, founder of lectinology
Friedrich Georg Wilhelm von Struve, astronomer
Eduard Toll, polar explorer
Ernst Rudolf von Trautvetter, botanist

Rectors

Notable alumni
Khachatur Abovian, Armenian writer
Karl Ernst von Baer, zoologist and "father" of embryology
Kārlis Balodis, Latvian economist, author of the civilian rationing
Krišjānis Barons, Latvian folklorist
Pan Halippa, politician in Moldova and Romania 
Adolf von Harnack, Protestant theologian and science administrator
Nicolai Hartmann, philosopher
Germain Henri Hess, physician and chemist
Jakob Hurt, folklorist
Hermann Johansen, ornithologist
Küllike Jürimäe, judge at the Court of Justice of the European Union
Elise Käer-Kingisepp, physician and pharmacologist
Wassily Kandinsky, abstract artist
Jaan Kaplinski, poet
Paul Keres, chess Grandmaster
Woldemar Kernig, internist, neurologist
Hermann von Keyserling, philosopher
Alberts Kviesis, Latvian statesman
Heinrich Lenz, physicist
Anne Lill, classical philologist
Emil Mattiesen (1875–1939), composer, pianist and philosopher
Gerhard von Maydell (1835 – 1894), explorer, cartographer and ethnologist
Lennart Meri, Estonian President
Leo Michelson, Latvian-American painter
Kārlis Mīlenbahs, Latvian linguist
Stepanos Nazarian, Armenian publisher
Tõnu Õnnepalu, author, poet
Ernst Öpik, astronomer
Friedrich Parrot, naturalist
Juhan Parts, Estonian Economic and former Prime Minister
Konstantin Päts, Estonian president
Ion Pelivan, Foreign Minister of Moldova 
Kristjan Jaak Peterson, linguist
Nikolay Pirogov, medical doctor
Vera Poska-Grünthal, lawyer and feminist
Georg von Rausch, historian
Alfons Rebane, military commander
Urmas Reinsalu (born 1975), politician
Karl Ristikivi, writer
Grigol Robakidze, Georgian writer
Alexander Schmidt (physiologist)
Leopold von Schrenck, zoologist, geographer and ethnographer
Josephine Serre, first woman to receive a dentistry degree from the University of Tartu, which occurred in 1814
Otto Strandman, Estonian Prime Minister and Head of State
Apolinary Szeluto, Polish composer
Gustav Heinrich Johann Apollon Tammann, pioneer physical metallurgist
A. H. Tammsaare, eminent Estonian writer
Otto Tief, Estonian Prime Minister
Jaanus Teppan, olympic cross-country skier
Valentin Tomberg, "mystic" and "magician"
Jakob von Uexküll, biologist
Krišjānis Valdemārs, Latvian writer
Mall Vaasma, mycologist
Eduards Veidenbaums, Latvian poet

Honorary doctorates 
 Umberto Eco, semiotician and novelist
 Jan Niecisław Baudouin de Courtenay, linguist
 Tenzin Gyatso, 14th Dalai Lama
 Vello Helk, historian
 Otto Kaiser, Protestant theologian
 Ivan Pavlov, physiologist
 Arvo Pärt, classical composer
 Konstantin Päts, Estonian president
 Thure von Uexküll, semiotician and medical scientist

References

University of Tartu
Tartu, University of
Tartu University